Chalala is a town and a municipality in Amreli district in the state of Gujarat, India.

Geography 
It has an average elevation of 160 metres (524 feet).

Demographics
 India  Chalala had a population of 16,721, of which 8,561 are males while 8,160 are females as per report released by Census India 2011. Literacy rate of Chalala city is 80.11%, higher than state average of 78.03%. In Chalala, Male literacy is around 86.68% while female literacy rate is 73.28%. Population of Children with age of 0-6 is 1738 which is 10.39% of total population of Chalala.

Notable people
Apa Dana or Dana Bhagat is a locally well known saint.

Transport
The nearby Airports are at Amreli, Ahmedabad, Bhavnagar and Rajkot.

References

Cities and towns in Amreli district